China Guangfa Bank (abbr: CGB) is a commercial banking corporation headquartered in Guangzhou, People's Republic of China. The bank was established in September 1988 as Guangdong Development Bank,. As CGB's largest shareholder, Citigroup has a 20% stake, while IBM holds 4.74%. China Life and State Grid each owns 20%, CITIC Trust, 12.85% and Puhua will hold the remaining 8% of the equity sold.

CGB offers a broad range of financial services including personal and corporate banking, asset management, wealth management, broker-dealer and advisory services, issuance services, and treasury services. It has more than 500 branches in mainland China, Hong Kong and Macau. Based in the Guangdong province bordering Hong Kong, GDB has assets of $265.8 billion (1.648 trillion RMB 2014-12-31 data) with its network expanded to include 34 branches, 661 business outlets, 114 Small Enterprises Banking Centers and 13 smart banks in 71 cities at prefecture level or above in 16 provinces (municipalities and autonomous regions). The Bank has over 9 million e-banking customers, over 27 million credit cards issued and correspondent bank partnerships with 1,687 bank headquarters and their branches in more than 128 countries and regions. It is the first financial institution to establish the strategic cooperation of multi-channel and multi-application e-payment with China UnionPay.

References

Banks of China
Government-owned companies of China
Companies based in Guangzhou
Banks established in 1988